Joseph Wilfred Kerman (3 April 1924 – 17 March 2014) was an American musicologist and music critic. Among the leading musicologists of his generation, his 1985 book Contemplating Music: Challenges to Musicology (published in the UK as Musicology) was described by Philip Brett in The Grove Dictionary of Music and Musicians as "a defining moment in the field." He was Professor Emeritus of Musicology at the University of California, Berkeley.

Life and career
Kerman, the son of an American journalist, William Zukerman, was born in London and educated at University College School there. He then attended New York University where he received his BA in 1943 and Princeton University where he received his PhD in 1950. While at Princeton he studied under Oliver Strunk, Randall Thompson and Carl Weinrich and wrote his doctoral thesis on the Elizabethan madrigal. When young, he used Kerman as a pen-name, and then adopted it officially. From 1949 to 1951 he taught at Westminster Choir College in Princeton. He then joined the faculty of University of California, Berkeley where he became a full professor in 1960 and was chairman of the music department from 1960 to 1963. In 1971, he was appointed Heather Professor of Music at Oxford University, a post he held until 1974, when he returned to Berkeley and again became chairman of the music department from 1991 until his retirement in 1994.

He based his first book, Opera as Drama (1956), on a series of essays written for The Hudson Review beginning in 1948. Published in several languages and multiple editions, Opera as Drama expresses Kerman's view that an opera's story is key and provides the basis for the structuring of both the librettist's text (which expresses the narrative) and the composer's music (which expresses the emotions in the story). For Kerman, the value of an opera as drama is undermined when there is a perceived disconnection between text and music. Among the operas Kerman discussed in the book was Puccini's Tosca which he controversially described as a "shabby little shocker."  (Kerman's assessment echoed George Bernard Shaw's earlier description of Sardou's play La Tosca on which the opera was based as an "empty-headed turnip ghost of a cheap shocker.")

His doctoral thesis on Elizabethan madrigals was published in 1962 and was notable for contextualizing them in the preceding Italian madrigal tradition. He maintained an interest in the English madrigal composer William Byrd throughout his career, and wrote several influential monographs on his work. He wrote a widely popular book on the Beethoven string quartets in the style of Donald Francis Tovey. With his wife, Vivian Kerman, he wrote the widely used textbook, Listen, first published in 1972 and now in its 7th edition co-authored by Gary Tomlinson. In 1985 he published his history and critique of traditional musicology, Contemplating Music: Challenges to Musicology, which argued that the intellectual isolation of musical theorists and musicologists and their excessively positivistic approach had hampered the development of serious musical criticism. Described in The Grove Dictionary of Music and Musicians as "a defining moment in the field", the book has been credited as helping to shape a "new musicology" that is willing to engage with feminist theory, hermeneutics, queer studies, and post-structuralism.

From 1997 to 1998 Kerman held the Charles Eliot Norton Memorial Chair at Harvard University, where he gave a series of public lectures on the importance of approaching musical texts and performances via a "close reading" similar to that used in literary studies, a theme that was central to many of his writings.  The Norton lectures were published in 1998 as Concerto Conversations. Kerman has written regularly for The New York Review of Books since 1977 and was a founding editor of the journal, 19th-Century Music. Critical essays written by Kerman from the late 1950s to the early 1990s are collected in his 1994 book, Write All These Down, which takes its title from a phrase in one of William Byrd's songs.

Honours
Joseph Kerman was elected Honorary Fellow of the Royal Academy of Music in 1972, Fellow of the American Academy of Arts and Sciences in 1973, and member of the American Philosophical Society in 2002. He also received  ASCAP's Deems Taylor Award for excellence in writing on music in 1981 and 1995, and the Otto Kinkeldey Award from the American Musicological Society for an outstanding work of musicological scholarship in 1970 and 1981.

Death and obituaries
Kerman died at his home in Berkeley on 17 March 2014. He was 89.

In addition to obituaries which appeared in the days following his death, two of his former associates in the field of musicology, Roger Parker and Carolyn Abbate, published some additional comments about working with Kerman in the obituary which they wrote for the British magazine, Opera.  There, they conclude that "the usual obituary language would not work" and continue:
We share a very vivid memory of Joe as editor. It takes the form of a mysterious wavy line, which he was wont to draw in the margin of this or that paragraph we had nervously proffered.  This undemonstrative  graphic gesture would say it all: telling us to think again, to re-draft, to watch the rhythms, the cadance of the words.  He could communicate so sparsely because one of his many gifts was to inspire you, as a writer, by the persuasiveness, energy, and beauty of his prose; you came to live for the—rarely bestowed—small check marks that signalled approval; the wavy line could keep you awake at night.
They continue by reflecting on their own professional relationships with Kerman over the years:
Joe published both of our first essays on opera in 19th-Century Music, the journal he helped to establish; he gave one of us a first academic job and lured the other to Berkeley as a visiting lecturer; he edited our first collaborative book; we dedicated our second to him.  Ever patient, ever smiling, he formed us—sometimes sentence-by-sentence.

Selected bibliography

Opera as Drama (1952)
The Elizabethan Madrigal (1962)
The Beethoven Quartets (1967)
The Kafka Sketchbook (1970)
The Masses and Motets of William Byrd (1980)
The New Grove Beethoven (1983) (with Alan Tyson)
Contemplating Music: Challenges to Musicology (1985) (UK title: Musicology)
Write All These Down: Essays on Music (1994)
Concerto Conversations (1998)
The Art of Fugue: Bach Fugues for Keyboard, 1715-1750 (2005)
Opera and the Morbidity of Music (2008)

References
Notes

Sources
Alperson, Philip, Musical Worlds: New Directions in the Philosophy of Music. Penn State Press, 1998. 

Budden, Julian (2005). Puccini: His Life and Works. Oxford and New York: Oxford University Press.  
Colby, Vineta, World Authors, 1980-1985, H.W. Wilson Co. (1991). 
Cummings, David, "Kerman, Joseph (Wilfred)", International Who's Who of Authors and Writers. Routledge, 2003, pp. 294–95. 
Evans, David Trevor, Phantasmagoria: A Sociology of Opera. Ashgate, 1999.  
Harvard University Gazette, "Norton Lectures To Be Delivered by Musicologist", 22 May 1997 
Hewett, Ivan, [https://www.theguardian.com/music/2014/apr/16/joseph-kerman Joseph Kerman obituary'], The Guardian, 16 April 2014
Kerman, Joseph, Write All These Down: Essays on Music. Berleley and Los Angeles: University of California Press (1994). 
Kerman, Joseph, Opera as Drama. Berkeley and Los Angeles: University of California Press (2005, first published New York: Alfred A. Knopf, 1956). 
Kerman, Joseph; Tomlinson, Gary; and Kerman, Vivian, Listen (6th edition), Bedford/St. Martin's, 2007. 
Lorraine, Renee Cox, "Write All These Down: Essays on Music by Joseph Kerman" (review), Notes, Second Series, Vol. 52, No. 2 (December 1995), pp. 505–507.   
Nicassio, Susan Vandiver, Tosca's Rome: The Play and the Opera in Historical Perspective. Chicago: University of Chicago Press, 2002. 
Oxford University Music Faculty (19 March 2014). "Professor Joseph Kerman (1924–2014)"
Pratt, Scott L., "Opera as Experience", The Journal of Aesthetic Education, Volume 43, Number 4, Winter 2009, pp. 74–87 
Royal Musical Association (19 March 2014) "Joseph Kerman 1924-2014", 19 March 2014.
Rothstein, Edward, "The Concerto as a Metaphor for the Individual in Society", New York Times, 30 October 1999
Tambling, Jeremy, A Night in at the Opera: Media Representations of Opera. Bloomington and London: Indiana University Press, 1994.  
Wingell, Richard and Herzog, Silvia, Introduction to Research in Music. Prentice Hall, 2001. 

External links
Joseph Kerman, Professor Emeritus, Musicology, Department of Music, University of California, Berkeley  
Erich Leinsdorf, "Culture and Musical Thinking" (review of Kerman's Contemplating Music: Challenges to Musicology), New York Times'', 26 May 1985

1924 births
2014 deaths
American musicologists
Harvard University faculty
Honorary Members of the Royal Academy of Music
New York University alumni
Opera critics
Princeton University alumni
University of California, Berkeley College of Letters and Science faculty
Westminster Choir College faculty
People educated at University College School
Writers from London
Heather Professors of Music
English male writers
Corresponding Fellows of the British Academy